Just Off Broadway is a 1942 Drama directed by Herbert I. Leeds, starring Lloyd Nolan and Marjorie Weaver.  This is the sixth of a series of seven that Lloyd Nolan played Michael Shayne for Twentieth Century Fox films. Hugh Beaumont portrayed Shayne in five more films from Producers Releasing Corporation.

Plot summary

Michael Shayne (Lloyd Nolan), a private investigator, flees from jury duty to prove the defendant's guilt. He and Judy Taylor (Marjorie Weaver), a reporter, begin looking into the suspect's alibis and discover that in addition to the murder he stands trial for, the man has also killed two others. Afterward, the detective is jailed for 60 days for defecting from the jury.

Cast

 Lloyd Nolan as Michael Shayne
 Marjorie Weaver as Judy Taylor
 Phil Silvers as Roy Higgins
 Janis Carter as Lillian Hubbard
 Richard Derr as John Logan, Defense Attorney
 Joan Valerie as Rita Darling
 Don Costello as George Dolphin
 Chester Clute as Sperty, Juror-Roommate
 Francis Pierlot as Sidney Arno, Jeweler
 Grant Richards as District Attorney John F. McGonagle
 George M. Carleton as Judge Robert Walters
 Alexander Lockwood as Count Edmond Telmachio
 William Haade as Warehouse Watchman
 Leyland Hodgson as Henry Randolph, Butler
 Oscar O'Shea as Pop, Stage Door Watchman

References

External links 
 
 
 
 

1942 films
American black-and-white films
American detective films
American crime drama films
20th Century Fox films
1942 crime drama films
Films directed by Herbert I. Leeds
1940s English-language films
1940s American films